The True Story (TV) is a documentary series shown on History in the United Kingdom and on the Smithsonian Channel in the US under the name The Real Story.

Episodes

2003
 Bravo Two Zero: The True Story (First Broadcast: 17 April 2003)

2005
 Mystery of the Hunley: The True Story (First Broadcast: 4 January 2005)

2006
 RMS Titanic's Final Moments: The True Story (First Broadcast: 26 February 2006)

2007
 Nostradamus: The True Story (First Broadcast: 9 January 2007)
 Jesse James: The True Story (First Broadcast: 23 January 2007)
 Frankenstein: The True Story (First Broadcast: 6 February 2007)
 Black Hawk Down: The True Story (First Broadcast: 13 February 2007)
 Stonehenge: The True Story (First Broadcast: 20 February 2007)
 Boston Strangler: The True Story (First Broadcast: 27 February 2007)
 Amelia Earhart Conspiracy: The True Story (First Broadcast: 6 March 2007)
 Bermuda Triangle: The True Story (First Broadcast: 13 March 2007)
 Pirates of the Caribbean: The True Story (First Broadcast: 20 March 2007)
 Anastasia Mystery: The True Story (First Broadcast: 3 April 2007)
 Roswell Incident: The True Story (First Broadcast: 10 April 2007)
 Herod the Great: The True Story (First Broadcast: 17 April 2007)
 Philosophers Stone: The True Story (First Broadcast: 24 April 2007)
 Angels and Demons: The True Story (First Broadcast: 1 May 2007)
 Bali Bombings: The True Story (First Broadcast 6 November 2007)
 Jonestown Cult Suicides: The True Story (First Broadcast: 13 November 2007)
 Blood Diamonds: The True Story (First Broadcast: 20 November 2007)
 Olympic Massacre: The True Story (First Broadcast: 4 December 2007)
 Titanic Conspiracy: The True Story (First Broadcast: 11 December 2007)
 Columbia's Final Flight: The True Story (First Broadcast: 18 December 2007)

2008
 Indiana Jones: The True Story (First Broadcast: 16 April 2008)
 James Bond: The True Story (First Broadcast: 23 April 2008)
 Escape from Alcatraz: The True Story (First Broadcast: 30 April 2008)
 Al Capone & the Untouchables: The True Story (First Broadcast: 7 May 2008)
 The Amityville Horror: The True Story (First Broadcast: 14 May 2008)

2009
 The Hunt for the Red October: The True Story (First Broadcast: 26 November 2009)
 Casino: The True Story (First Broadcast: 10 December 2009)
 The Exorcist: The True Story (First Broadcast: 16 December 2009)
 Bourne Identity: The True Story (First Broadcast: 27 December 2009)

2010
 The Silence of the Lambs: The True Story (First Broadcast: 7 January 2010)

2011
 Titanic: The True Story (First Broadcast: 7 January 2011)
 Jurassic Park: The True Story (First Broadcast: 18 January 2011)
 Jaws: The True Story (First Broadcast: 3 March 2011)
 Gladiator: The True Story (First Broadcast: 21 April 2011)

2012
 True Grit: The True Story (First Broadcast: 12 February 2012)
 Saving Private Ryan: The True Story (First Broadcast: 14 February 2012)
 Braveheart: The True Story (First Broadcast: 21 February 2012)
 Apollo 13: The True Story (First Broadcast: 28 February 2012)
 Close Encounters of the Third Kind: The True Story (First Broadcast: 24 May 2012)
 Master and Commander (The Far Side of the World): The True Story (First Broadcast: ?)

2013
 Star Trek: The True Story (First Broadcast: 5 January 2013)
 Platoon: The True Story (First Broadcast: 11 January 2013)
 Scream: The True Story (First Broadcast: 24 January 2013)

References
 Demand Fives Episode Numbering for The True Story 
 British Film Institute Film & TV Database - The True Story 
 The True Story - Episodes on Channel5.com

Channel 5 (British TV channel) original programming
2008 British television series debuts